Based in Laredo, South Texas Development Council (STDC) is a voluntary association of cities, counties and special districts in southern Texas.

Counties served
Jim Hogg
Starr
Webb
Zapata

Cities in the region
Laredo
Rio Grande City
Roma
Rio Bravo
Zapata
El Cenizo
Escobares
La Grulla

References

External links
South Texas Development Council - Official site.

Texas Association of Regional Councils
Organizations based in Laredo, Texas
Organizations based in Texas